Romance Without Finance is the first studio album by singer-songwriter Theo Katzman. It was released on November 15, 2011. The album's sound draws from Katzman's influences which include rock, soul, folk and pop. Katzman is the composer and performs on several instruments. Music videos of two tracks, "Hard For You" and "Brooklyn", were released in 2012. The name of the album is derived from an old jazz song by Tiny Grimes, the full phrase being "romance without finance is a nuisance". The album debuted at #5 on the iTunes Singer-Songwriter albums chart.

Track listing

Personnel 
Credits adapted from Bandcamp music store.

 Theo Katzman – writer, performer, engineer, producer, vocals
 Devin Kerr – engineer, mixing, mastering, producer, percussion, backing vocals (track 2), rhodes (track 4), piano (track 8)
 Lee Katzman – lyrics (track 6)
 Joe Dart – fender bass (tracks 2, 8, 9)
 Woody Goss – rhodes (tracks 4, 8)
 Joey Dosik – piano (tracks 4, 7), mellotron (track 9)
 The West Deuce Kitchen Choir – Tyler Duncan, Jae Gerhart, Mike Shea, Hannah Winkler, Julian Allen (tracks 7, 9)
 Good Hertz Studio – recording
 Tyler Duncan – additional mixing
 Annlie Huang – assistant engineer
 Ron Torella – piano technician
 Christine Hucal – photography
 Jack Stratton – graphic design

References

2011 albums
Theo Katzman albums